The 2013 New Brunswick electoral redistribution was undertaken through the process set out in the Electoral Boundaries and Representation Act of New Brunswick, Canada. The legislation establishes a statutory requirement for redistribution of electoral districts after every second New Brunswick general election.

A commission was struck to draw 49 electoral districts, a decrease from 55 districts, which will first be used in the 2014 provincial election. The 49 boundaries will have to be within the range of 95% to 105% of the 1/49th of the number of registered voters in the province except in "extraordinary circumstances".

Under the legislation, the commission will be chaired by one anglophone and one francophone and consist of 3 to 5 other commissioners, all of whom must be New Brunswick residents.

Legislative changes 

The Electoral Boundaries and Representation Act of 2005 set out for a redistribution of 55 ridings after every decennial census with ridings within plus or minus 10% of 1/55th of the population. In Fall 2012, the legislation was amended to reduce the number of ridings to 49, shift away from census-based population numbers to the number of registered voters, and to make the process occur after every second election (approximately once every 8 years) rather than after each census (once every 10 years).

Commission 
The commission was appointed on August 28, 2012 following the unanimous recommendation of a committee of the Legislative Assembly of New Brunswick. Its members are:
 Co-chair: Annise Hollies, former chief electoral officer of New Brunswick
 Co-Chair: Allan Maher, former member of the legislative assembly (1978–1995)
 Member: Conde Grondin, retired professor of political science
 Member: Sue Murray, executive director of Atlantic Provinces Medical Peer Review
 Member: Jean-Guy Rioux, retired teacher and past-president of La Federation des communautés francophones et acadienne du Canada
 Member: James Stanley, a lawyer involved with the labour movement

Public hearings 
Hearings were held in 13 communities around New Brunswick in October and early November 2012. Following these preliminary hearings, the commission created a draft proposal for public consideration at a second round of hearings that were held in February and March 2013.

New boundaries 
The commission released a draft map on January 17, 2013 which was open to changes following public consultations held from February 17 to March 6, 2013. Thereafter, the Commission prepared a final map, released on April 25. The Commission drew mostly completely new ridings. They said that because they had to reduce the number of ridings by about 10%, the tinkering that had been undertaken by previous boundaries commissions was not possible:
When a Commission’s mandate is to make little or no change to the total number of ridings, it is both reasonable and practical to begin the work with the existing boundaries and see what if any adjustments should be made. However, the Legislative Assembly has instructed this Commission to draw a map with substantially fewer ridings. In order to meet the requirements of the legislation, the Commission must not simply revise existing boundaries – they must build an entirely new electoral map.

The 49 ridings proposed in January were altered only slightly in the final map released on April 25. The final map was reviewed again by the commission after 23 appeals were filed backed by members of the legislature. The Commission adopted two name changes, and one minor boundary change affecting 35 voters as a result of the appeals.

New districts 
These districts are almost entirely new, not reflecting any one former district or a merger of the majority of two previous districts.

* - measured in the percentage of its polling stations that came from the noted districts

Merged districts 
These districts are a result of a merger of large parts of two previous districts.

* - measured in the percentage of its polling stations that came from the noted districts
** - riding was later renamed Oromocto-Lincoln-Fredericton in 2017.

Largely unchanged districts 
These districts underwent only minor changes.

* - measured in the percentage of its polling stations that came from the noted districts
** - riding was later renamed Saint Croix in 2016.

Former districts 
The commission was mandated with the creation of 49 districts, where 55 had existed before. The Commission stated this required recreating a map from scratch, though by coincidence, not design, some new districts resembled preceding districts. The old districts transposed into the new districts as follows.

Largely intact districts 
In these districts, 70% or more of their polling stations continued into a new district.

* - measured in the percentage of its polling stations that went to the noted districts

Split districts 
These districts were split more or less in two.

* - measured in the percentage of its polling stations that went to the noted districts

Dispersed districts 
These districts were abolished with their parts being widely spread across several new districts.

* - measured in the percentage of its polling stations that went to the noted districts

Court challenge 
After the release of the map, several Francophone organizations indicated they planned to challenge the law in court. The court challenge was initially delayed because of mediation between the groups and the provincial government. Mediation broke down without a result satisfactory to the groups, so they filed to challenge the boundaries in court. Two organizations and two individuals filed a joint suit against the process in general, and specifically including the communities of Memramcook and Neguac in majority Anglophone districts.

Sources 

2013 in Canadian politics
Politics of New Brunswick
Electoral redistributions in Canada
New Brunswick Legislature
2013 in New Brunswick